= Khalifehlu Kandi-ye Kuchak =

- Location in Iran
- Coordinates: 39°21′35″N 47°59′48″E
- Country: Iran
- Province: Ardabil Province
- Time zone: UTC+3:30 (IRST)
  - Summer (DST): UTC+4:30 (IRDT)

Khalifehlu Kandi-ye Kuchak is a village in the Ardabil Province of Iran.
